Kirwani is a musical scale in Hindustani classical music. It is an Indian raga specially suited for instrumental music. The scale is the same as the harmonic minor in western music. There are shades of Pilu in Kirwani. This raga is said to have been borrowed from the Carnatic music raga Keeravani.

Arohana & Avarohana 
The swaras used in this raga are:

Arohana : S R g m P d N S'

Thus: C D E-flat F G A-flat B c

Avarohana : S' N d P m g R S

Vadi & Samavadi 

There is no strict Vadi-Samavadi, but Re, ga, pa and dha are important.

Pakad or Chalan
d- P- g R-- S R---, R-- g m P d P

Organization & Relationships
Related ragas: Pilu

Thaat: Kirwani cannot be fit into one of Bhatkhande's thaats;. Bhatkhande himself did not list it as such.

Time Of Singing

Samay (Time) 
Madhyaratri (midnight)

Historical Information 
It is "recently" taken from the musical scale Keeravani of South Indian classical music (Carnatic music). It is similar to an ancient version of Pilu

Tamil Film Songs

References

External links 
Examples
 Film Songs in Rag Kirwani
 More details about raga Kirwani

Literature

.

.

.

.

Hindustani ragas